Afrasura neavi is a moth of the subfamily Arctiinae first described by George Hampson in 1914. It is found in Tanzania and Uganda.

References

Moths described in 1914
neavi
Insects of Uganda
Insects of Tanzania
Moths of Africa